United Nations Security Council resolution 833, adopted unanimously on 27 May 1993, after recalling resolutions 687 (1991), 689 (1991), 773 (1992) and 806 (1993) in addition to a report by the Secretary-General Boutros Boutros-Ghali, the council noted the continuing work of the United Nations Iraq-Kuwait Boundary Demarcation Commission.

The resolution recalled that the United Nations Iraq–Kuwait Boundary Demarcation Commission was not to reallocate territory, but for the first time mark the precise coordinates of the border between Kuwait and Iraq on the basis of the agreement between the two countries in 1963. Iraq was reminded of its obligations under Resolution 687 which formed the basis of the ceasefire. The council also welcomed the secretary-general's decision requiring the United Nations Iraq–Kuwait Observation Mission (UNIKOM) to finalise the boundary of the demilitarised zone demarcated by the commission.

Acting under Chapter VII of the United Nations Charter, the security council welcomed and appreciated the work of the Boundary Demarcation Commission on its completion. It also reaffirmed that the decisions of the commission on the boundary were final and demanded that Iraq and Kuwait respect the inviolability of international borders.

See also
 Gulf War
 Invasion of Kuwait
 Kuwait–Iraq barrier
 List of United Nations Security Council Resolutions 801 to 900 (1993–1994)

References

External links
 
Text of the Resolution at undocs.org

 0833
 0833
1993 in Iraq
Iraq–Kuwait border
 0833
May 1993 events